Richard Wayne Parker (August 6, 1848 – November 28, 1923) was an American Republican Party politician from New Jersey who represented the 6th congressional district from 1895 to 1903, the 7th district from 1903 to 1911, and the 9th district from 1914 to 1919 and again from 1921 to 1923. He was a grandson of James Parker, also a Representative from New Jersey.

Biography
Born in Morristown, he graduated from Princeton College in 1867 and from Columbia Law School in 1869. He was admitted to the bar of New Jersey in 1870 and commenced practice in Newark. He was a member of the New Jersey General Assembly in 1885 and 1886 and was an unsuccessful candidate for election to the Fifty-third Congress.

Parker was elected as a Republican to the Fifty-fourth and to the seven succeeding Congresses, holding office from March 4, 1895 to March 3, 1911. During the Sixty-first Congress, he was chairman of the Committee on the Judiciary. He was an unsuccessful candidate for reelection in 1910 to the Sixty-fifth Congress and resumed the practice of law in Newark. He was then elected to the Sixty-third Congress to fill the vacancy caused by the resignation of Walter I. McCoy, was reelected to the Sixty-fourth and Sixty-fifth Congresses, and served from December 1, 1914, to March 3, 1919. He was an unsuccessful candidate for reelection in 1918 to the Sixty-sixth Congress and was a delegate to the 1916 Republican National Convention. He was elected to the Sixty-seventh Congress, holding office from March 4, 1921 to March 3, 1923, and was an unsuccessful candidate for reelection in 1922 to the Sixty-eighth Congress.

Parker died in Paris, France, in 1923, and was interred in St. Peter's Churchyard, Perth Amboy, New Jersey.

External links

Richard Wayne Parker at The Political Graveyard

1848 births
1923 deaths
Phillips Academy alumni
Columbia Law School alumni
Republican Party members of the New Jersey General Assembly
People from Morristown, New Jersey
Politicians from Morris County, New Jersey
Princeton University alumni
Republican Party members of the United States House of Representatives from New Jersey